These venues are multi-used for indoor games, such as ice hockey, bandy, handball and floorball. Concerts and exhibitions are shown when the venues are not in use. Some of the venues are used in the national league in respectively sport.

Venues